Hemisaga elongata is a species of insect in family Tettigoniidae. It is endemic to Australia.

Sources

Tettigoniidae
Orthoptera of Australia
Critically endangered fauna of Australia
Critically endangered insects
Taxonomy articles created by Polbot
Insects described in 1993